Boller Brothers, often written Boller Bros., was an architectural firm based in Kansas City, Missouri which specialized in theater design in the Midwestern United States during the first half of the 20th century. Carl Heinrich Boller (1868–1946) and Robert Otto Boller (1887–1962) are credited with the design of almost 100 classic theaters ranging from small vaudeville venues to grand movie palaces.

About 20 Boller Brothers works are listed on the National Register of Historic Places.

Arkansas 
Baxter Theater Mountain Home, Arkansas Closed
New Theatre, 9 N. 10th St. Fort Smith, Arkansas, NRHP-listed Closed
Rialto Theatre Searcy, Arkansas Open

California 
Corona Theatre Corona, California Closed
Fontana Theatre Fontana, California Renovating
Inglewood Theater Inglewood, California Demolished
Largo Theatre Los Angeles, California Demolished
Montrose Theatre Montrose, California Demolished
Tracy Theatre Long Beach, California Demolished
West Coast Theatre Santa Ana, California Closed
Walkers Orange County Theater, 308 N. Main St. Santa Ana, CA (Boller, Carl), NRHP-listed
White Theatre Fresno, California Demolished
Yost Theatre Santa Ana, California Closed

Colorado 
Boulder Theater Boulder, Colorado Open
Chief Theatre Pueblo, Colorado Closed

Illinois 
Granada Theater Mt. Vernon, Illinois Renovating
Illinois Theatre Jacksonville, Illinois Open
Majestic Theatre (East St. Louis, Illinois), 240-246 Collinsville Ave. East St. Louis, IL (Boller Bros.), NRHP-listed Closed
Will Rogers Theater Collinsville, Illinois Closed

Kansas 

Arcada Theater Holton, Kansas Closed
Brown Grand Theatre Concordia, Kansas Open 
Burford Theatre Arkansas City, Kansas Renovating
Booth Theater, 119 W. Myrtle St. Independence, Kansas (Boller Brothers), NRHP-listed Renovating / Open
Chanute Cinema I & II Chanute, Kansas Open
Crawford Theatre Wichita, Kansas Demolished
Crest Theater, 1905 Lakin Ave. Great Bend, KS (Boller and Lusk), NRHP-listed
Crest Theater Wichita, Kansas Demolished
Crown Uptown Theatre Wichita, Kansas Open 
Crystal Plaza Theatre Ottawa, Kansas Open 
Dream Theater, 629 N. Main St. Russell, KS (Boller, Robert O.), NRHP-listed
Electric Theatre Kansas City, Kansas Demolished
Fine Arts Shawnee, Kansas Renovating
Fox Plaza Liberal, Kansas Closed
Fox-Watson Theater Building, 155 S. Santa Fe Ave. Salina, KS (Boller Brothers), NRHP-listed Open
Hutchinson's Historic FOX Theatre, 18 E. First Ave. Hutchinson, Kansas (Boller Brothers), NRHP-listed Open
Emporia Granada Theatre, 809 Commercial Emporia, KS (Boller Brothers), NRHP-listed, Granada Theatre Emporia, Kansas Open Website: Emporia Granada Theatre
Granada Theater, 1013-1019 Minnesota Ave. Kansas City, KS (Boller Brothers), NRHP-listed Open
Granada Theatre Lawrence, Kansas Open
Jayhawk Theatre | The State Theatre of Kansas Topeka, Kansas official Jayhawk website Closed - to be restored 
Jayhawk Theater Kansas City, Kansas Demolished
Hollywood Theater (Leavenworth, Kansas), 401 Delaware St. Leavenworth, KS (Boller Bros. and Boller, Robert), NRHP-listed
Majestic Theatre Phillipsburg, Kansas Open
Nomar Theatre Wichita, Kansas Closed
Norton Theatre Norton, Kansas Open
Overland Theater/Rio Theatre, 7204 W. 80th St. Overland Park, Kansas (Boller, Robert), NRHP-listed
State Theatre Larned, Kansas Open
Stiefel Theatre for the Performing Arts Salina, Kansas Open 
Sunflower Theater Peabody, Kansas Closed
Uptown Theatre Iola, Kansas Status Unknown
Varsity Theater Lawrence, Kansas Closed
Wareham Theatre Manhattan, Kansas Open

Missouri 
Aladdin Theatre Kansas City, Missouri Closed
Apollo Theatre Kansas City, Missouri Closed
Ashland Theatre Kansas City, Missouri Closed
Ben Bolt Theatre Chillicothe, Missouri Demolished
Benton Theatre Kansas City, Missouri Closed
Broadway Theatre Cape Girardeau, Missouri Closed
Calvin Opera House Washington, Missouri Open
Capitol Theatre Jefferson City, Missouri Closed
Davis Theatre West Plains, Missouri Closed
Electric Theatre St. Joseph, Missouri Demolished
Empress Theatre Kansas City, Missouri Demolished
Esquire Theatre Bolivar, Missouri Closed
Garden Theater Kansas City, Missouri Demolished
Gillham Theatre Kansas City, Missouri Closed
Hall Theatre Columbia, Missouri Closed, building NRHP-listed as contributing building in North Ninth Street Historic District, 5-36 North Ninth St. Columbia, MO (Boller Brothers)
Halloran Theatre Moberly, Missouri Closed
Kimo Theatre Kansas City, Missouri Demolished
Landers Theater, 311 E. Walnut Springfield, Missouri (Boller, Carl) Open
Lincoln Theatre Kansas City, Missouri Closed
Mercier Theatre Perryville, Missouri Closed
Midland Theatre Kansas City, Missouri Open
Missouri Theatre Columbia, Missouri Open, NRHP-listed as Missouri Theater, 201-215 S. 9th St. Columbia, MO (Boller Brothers)
Missouri Theater, St. Joseph, Missouri Open
Norside Theatre St. Louis, Missouri Demolished
Orpheum Theater Hannibal, Missouri Renovating
Owen's Theatre Branson, Missouri Open
Paramount Theatre Rock Port, Missouri closed
Plaza Theater Kansas City, Missouri Closed
Regal Theater St. Joseph, Missouri Closed
Regent Theatre Kansas City, Missouri Closed
Rockhill Theatre Kansas City, Missouri Demolished
Sun Theatre Kansas City, Missouri Closed
Uptown Theater Sedalia, Missouri Closed
Uptown Theatre Rolla, Missouri Demolished March 2010
Warwick Theatre Kansas City, Missouri Closed

Mississippi
Elkin Theatre Aberdeen, Mississippi Open

Nebraska
Lincoln Theatre Lincoln, Nebraska Demolished in 1962

New Mexico
El Morro Theater, 205–209 W. Coal Ave. Gallup, NM (Boller, Carl), NRHP-listed Open
KiMo Theater, 421 Central Ave. Albuquerque, New Mexico (Boller Bros.), NRHP-listed Open
Lensic Theater, Santa Fe, New Mexico Open
Lyceum Theater, 409 Main St. Clovis, NM (Boller Bros.), NRHP-listed Open

Oklahoma 
Bays Theater (800 seats), Main & Bridge, Blackwell, Oklahoma Closed 
Centre Theatre 1947–present (1700 seats), 415 Couch Drive, Oklahoma City, Oklahoma Closed 
Cine 2 Theater 1926-2006 (1000 seats), 225 Main Street, Henryetta, Oklahoma Demolished 
Coleman Theatre 1929–present (1600 seats), First & Main, Miami, OK (Boller Brothers), NRHP-listed Open
Criterion Theater 1921-1973 (1900 seats), 108 West Main Street, Oklahoma City, Oklahoma Demolished
Liberty Theater 1915-1976 (1500 seats), 19 North Robinson Avenue, Oklahoma City, Oklahoma Demolished 
Morgan Theater 1914-2008 (1200 seats), 316 Main Street, Henryetta, Oklahoma Demolished
Oklahoman Theater (1000 seats), 315 South Main Street, Hobart, Oklahoma closed
Plaza Theater 1935–present (900 seats), 1725 Northwest Sixteenth Street, Oklahoma City, Oklahoma Closed 
Poncan Theatre 1927–present (800 seats), 104 East Grand Avenue. Ponca City, Oklahoma (Boller Brothers), NRHP-listed Open
Rialto Theater 1910-1972 (1200 seats), 13-17 Third Street, Tulsa, Oklahoma Demolished 
Ritz Theater 1928-1963 (900 seats), 1012 Northeast Thirteenth Street, Oklahoma City, Oklahoma Demolished

Pennsylvania 

Latonia Theatre 1929–present (1600 seats), 1 East First Street, Oil City, Pennsylvania  under renovation

Texas 
Granada Theatre Plainview, Texas Closed
Texas Theatre San Antonio, Texas Demolished
Wichita Theatre 1908-present (1100 seats original, 800 current) 919 Indiana Wichita Falls, Texas Open

Wyoming 
Kirby Theatre Worland, Wyoming Status Unknown
New Aileen Theatre Worland, Wyoming Status Unknown

References

External links
 Boller Brothers Treasures
 Historic Movie Theatres of Missouri
 Historic Movie Theatres of Kansas
 Boller Brothers Architectural Records

Architecture firms based in Missouri
American theatre architects
Companies based in Kansas City, Missouri